The Iranian plateau or Persian plateau is a geological feature in Western Asia, Central Asia, and South Asia. It makes up part of the Eurasian Plate and is wedged between the Arabian Plate and the Indian Plate, situated between the Zagros Mountains to the west, the Caspian Sea and the Köpet Dag to the north, the Armenian Highlands and the Caucasus Mountains to the northwest, the Strait of Hormuz and the Persian Gulf to the south, and the Indian subcontinent to the east.

As a historical region, it includes Parthia, Media, Persis, and some of the previous territories of Greater Iran. The Zagros form the plateau's western boundary, and its eastern slopes may also be included in the term. The Encyclopædia Britannica excludes "lowland Khuzestan" explicitly and characterizes Elam as spanning "the region from the Mesopotamian plain to the Iranian plateau".

Geology 
In geology, the plateau region of Iran primarily formed from the accretionary Gondwanan terranes between the Turan platform to the north and the Main Zagros Thrust; the suture zone between the northward moving Arabian plate and the Eurasian continent is the Iranian plateau.  It is a geologically well-studied area because of general interest in continental collision zones, and because of Iran's long history of research in geology, particularly in economic geology (although Iran's major oil reserves are not in the plateau).

Geography

The Iranian plateau in geology refers to a geographical area north of the great folded mountain belts resulting from the collision of the Arabian Plate with the Eurasian Plate. In this definition, the Iranian plateau does not cover southwestern Iran.

The plateau extends from East Azerbaijan Province in northwest of Iran (Persia) all the way to Afghanistan and Pakistan west of the Indus River. It also includes smaller parts of the Republic of Azerbaijan, Iraqi Kurdistan, and Turkmenistan.

Its mountain ranges can be divided into five major subregions (see below).

The Northwestern Iranian plateau, where the Pontic and Taurus Mountains converge, is rugged country with higher elevations, a more severe climate, and greater precipitation than are found on the Anatolian Plateau. The region is known as the Anti-Taurus, and the average elevation of its peaks exceeds 3,000 m. Mount Ararat, at 5,137 meters (16,854 ft) the highest point in Turkey, is located in the Anti-Taurus. Lake Van is situated in the mountains at an elevation of 1,546 meters (5,072 ft).

The headwaters of major rivers arise in the Anti-Taurus: the east-flowing Aras River flows into the Caspian Sea, and the south-flowing Euphrates and Tigris join in Iraq before flowing into the Persian Gulf. Several small streams that flow into the Black Sea or landlocked Lake Van also originate in these mountains. The Indus River begins in the highlands of Tibet and flows the length of Pakistan almost tracing the eastern edge of the Iranian plateau. 

Southeast Anatolia lies south of the Anti-Taurus Mountains. It is a region of rolling hills and a broad plateau surface that extends into Syria. Elevations decrease gradually, from about 800 meters (2,600 ft) in the north to about 500 meters (1,600 ft) in the south. Traditionally, wheat and barley are the main crops of the region.

Mountain ranges

Northwest Iranian ranges
 Alborz
 Damavand

southwest Iranian ranges
 Zagros
 Dena

Central Iranian plateau
 Kūh-e Hazār 
 Kuh-e Jebal Barez

Eastern Iranian ranges
 Kopet Dag
 Kuh-e Siah Khvani  
 Eshdeger Range
  
 Balochistan
 Sikaram  
 Kuh-e Taftan  
 Zargun

Rivers and plains 
 Kavir Desert
 Lut Desert
 Hamun-e Jaz Murian
 Halil River
 Gavkhouni
 Zayandeh River
 Sistan Basin
 Helmand River
 Farah River

History

In the Bronze Age, Elam stretched across the Zagros mountains, connecting Mesopotamia and the Iranian plateau. The kingdoms of Aratta, known from cuneiform sources, may have been located in the Central Iranian plateau. In classical antiquity the region was known as Persia, due to the Persian Achaemenid dynasty originating in Fars. The Middle Persian Erān (whence Modern Persian Irān) began to be used in reference to the state (rather than as an ethnic designator) from the Sassanid period (see Etymology of Iran).

Archaeology

Archaeological sites and cultures of the Iranian plateau include:
 Mehrgarh, predecessor of Indus Valley civilization
 Central Iranian plateau ("Jiroft culture")
 Shahr-i Sokhta
 Konar Sandal
 Tepe Yahya
 Zayandeh River Civilization
 Tappeh Sialk
 Paleolithic sites
 Niasar
 Sefid-Ab
 Kaftar Khoun
 Qaleh Bozi Caves
 Mirak
 Delazian
 Tabas
 Masileh

Flora

The plateau has historical oak and poplar forests. Oak forests are found around Shiraz. Aspen, elm, ash, willow, walnut, pine, and cypress are also found, though the latter two are rare. As of 1920, poplar was harvested for making doors. Elm was used for ploughs. Other trees like acacia, cypress, and Turkestan elm were used for decorative purposes. Flower wise, the plateau can grow lilac, jasmine, and roses. Hawthorn and Cercis siliquastrum are common, which are both used for basket weaving.

Fauna 

The plateau is abundant with wildlife including leopards, bears, hyenas, wild boars, ibex, gazelles, and mouflons. These animals are mostly found in the wooded mountains of the plateau. The shores of the Caspian Sea and the Persian Gulf house aquatic birds such as seagulls, ducks, and geese. 
Deer, hedgehogs, foxes, and 22 species of rodents are found in semidesert, and palm squirrels and Asiatic black bears live in Baluchistan.

Wide variety of amphibians and reptiles such as toads, frogs, tortoises, lizards, salamanders, racers, rat snakes (Ptyas), cat snakes (Tarbophis fallax), and vipers live the Baluchistan region and along the slopes of the Elburz and Zagros mountains. 200 varieties of fish live in the Persian Gulf. 30 species of the most important commercial fish Sturgeon is found in the Caspian Sea.

Economy

The Iranian plateau harvests trees for making doors, ploughs, and baskets. Fruit is grown also. Pears, apples, apricots, quince, plums, nectarines, cherries, mulberries, and peaches were commonly seen in the 20th century. Almonds and pistachios are common in warmer areas. Dates, oranges, grapes, melon, and limes are also grown. Other edibles include potatoes and cauliflower, which were hard to grow until European settlement brought irrigation improvements. Other vegetables include cabbage, tomatoes, artichokes, cucumbers, spinach, radishes, lettuce, and eggplants.

The plateau also produces wheat, barley, millet, beans, opium, cotton, lucerne, and tobacco. The barley is fed mainly to horses. Sesame is grown and made into sesame oil. Mushrooms and manna were also seen in the plateau area as of 1920. Caraway is grown in the Kerman Province.

See also
 Biosphere reserves of Iran
 Geography of Iran
 List of Iranian four-thousanders

Notes

References

 Y. Majidzadeh, Sialk III and the Pottery Sequence at Tepe Ghabristan. The Coherence of the Cultures of the Central Iranian Plateau, Iran 19, 1981, 141–46.

External links

 
 

 
Plateaus of Asia
Landforms of Central Asia
Landforms of South Asia
Landforms of Western Asia
Landforms of the Middle East
Plateaus of Iran
Geography of Kurdistan
Geography of the Middle East
Plateaus of Pakistan
Landforms of Afghanistan
Landforms of Azerbaijan
Landforms of Turkmenistan
Physiographic provinces
Regions of Asia